NRP Douro was a  built for the Portuguese Navy in the 1910s.

Design

The Portuguese Navy had struggled to secure funding for new ships after the 1890s, when a number of protected cruisers and smaller craft had been built. The navy nevertheless made repeated attempts for ambitious construction programs. After the toppling of the Portuguese monarchy in 1910, the navy submitted another large construction plan in 1912, which the new republican government passed (and then reduced in scope in 1913). The revised plan called for two new cruisers, six destroyers, and three submarines; the Guadiana class of four destroyers comprised a significant part of the program. The design for the new ships was prepared by Yarrow Shipbuilders.

They had a crew of 80 officers and enlisted men. The ships were powered by two Parsons steam turbines, with steam provided by three Yarrow water-tube boilers that were vented through individual funnels.

The ship carried an armament that consisted of a single  gun and two  guns, along with four  torpedo tubes. The 102 mm gun was placed on the forecastle and the 76 mm guns were mounted on the centerline further aft, one between the first and second funnel and the other gun further aft. The torpedo tubes were in twin mounts, also on the centerline, one aft of the third funnel and the other at the stern.

Service history

Douro was built at the Lisbon Naval Base and was launched on 22 January 1913. She thereafter completed fitting out and was ready to begin her initial sea trials in July. By May 1915, the ship had completed her trials and had entered active service.

The Portuguese Navy played a major role in domestic politics in the early 20th century. The Portuguese Army launched a coup against the government in December 1917, and the navy retaliated on 8 January 1918 to restore the republican government. Douro, her sister ship Guadiana, and the elderly ironclad warship  anchored in Lisbon, where army field artillery took the ships under fire. Vasco da Gama traded shots with the artillery, but after about twenty-five minutes of shooting, abandoned the effort and flew a white flag, prompting Douro and Guadiana to do the same. After coming under rifle fire from soldiers ashore, the men from Douro and Guadiana abandoned ship and took shelter behind the American patrol boat , which was anchored in the harbor at that time. None of the ships were damaged in the incident.

During unrest in Lisbon on the night of 10 December 1923, Douros captain, Manual Carvalho, and part of her crew sided with rebels. Carvalho issued an ultimatum to the other warships in the city and fired several shots at an outlying village, but no other vessels were willing to join the action. The rebellion quickly broke down and Carvalho surrendered his ship. He and the insurrectionist elements of the crew were imprisoned at the San Julian da Baza fortress and Douro was disarmed. The rest of the crew was sent on leave and the other warships in Lisbon were dispersed to other ports to prevent another incident. Despite defeating the insurrection, the government of António Ginestal Machado was forced to resign after a vote of no confidence in the Portuguese parliament.

The ship was eventually discarded in 1931.

Notes

References
 
 
 
 
 
 
 
 

Guadiana-class destroyers